The 1977 NCAA Division I basketball tournament involved 32 American schools playing in single-elimination play to determine the National Champion of Men's  NCAA Division I college basketball. It began on Saturday, March 12, 1977, and ended with the championship game on Monday, March 28 in Atlanta. A total of 32 games were played, including a national third-place game. This was the final tournament in which teams were not seeded.

Marquette, coached by Al McGuire, won the national title with a 67–59 victory in the final game over North Carolina, coached by Dean Smith. Butch Lee of Marquette was named the tournament's Most Outstanding Player. Publicly announcing his retirement during the middle of the season, McGuire retired as head coach immediately after the game. UNLV and UNC Charlotte were third and fourth place, respectively.  Marquette's seven losses were a record at the time for the most losses in a season by a national champion, exceeded four years later  in 1981 by Indiana with nine.

Schedule and venues

The following are the sites that were selected to host each round of the 1977 tournament:

First round
March 12
East Region
 The Palestra, Philadelphia, Pennsylvania
 Reynolds Coliseum, Raleigh, North Carolina
Midwest Region
 Lloyd Noble Center, Norman, Oklahoma
 Omaha Civic Auditorium, Omaha, Nebraska
West Region
 ASISU Minidome, Pocatello, Idaho
 McKale Center, Tucson, Arizona
March 13
Mideast Region
 LSU Assembly Center, Baton Rouge, Louisiana
 Assembly Hall, Bloomington, Indiana

Regional semifinals and finals (Sweet Sixteen and Elite Eight)
March 17 and 19
East Regional, Cole Field House, College Park, Maryland
Mideast Regional, Rupp Arena, Lexington, Kentucky
Midwest Regional, Myriad Convention Center, Oklahoma City, Oklahoma
West Regional, Marriott Center, Provo, Utah

National semifinals, 3rd-place game, and championship (Final Four and championship)
March 26 and 28
The Omni, Atlanta, Georgia

The 1977 tournament saw Atlanta become the sixteenth host city to the Final Four, the Omni Coliseum would be the last facility until 2019 to host the Final Four without hosting a previous tournament. Three cities – Bloomington, Indiana, Norman, Oklahoma and Omaha, Nebraska – were hosts to the tournament for the first time; while Omaha has since hosted in the Civic Auditorium's replacement, CHI Health Center Omaha, Norman has not hosted since. Also, the tournament returned to Oklahoma City for just the second time ever; it would be another 17 years before it would host again, however.

Teams

Bracket

* – Denotes overtime period

East region
Cole Field House – College Park, MarylandFirst round games were played at Raleigh, North Carolina and Philadelphia, Pennsylvania on Saturday, March 12.

West region
Most of the excitement surrounding the Western Regional was the anticipated matchup between top-five-ranked teams UCLA and UNLV. Jerry Tarkanian had lost three times in the tournament to UCLA while he was at Long Beach State, including a heartbreaking 57–55 loss in the 1971 West Regional final in which Long Beach led by eleven in the second half. Many felt this UNLV team gave him the best opportunity to beat his longtime nemesis. But he never got the chance as UCLA was stunned in the regional semi final by unranked Idaho State of the Big Sky Conference. This was the first time since 1963 that UCLA made the tournament but failed to get to the Final Four.  Down by a point at halftime, UNLV went on to easily beat Idaho State 

Marriott Center – Provo, Utah
First round games were played at Pocatello, Idaho and Tucson, Arizona on Saturday, March 12.

Mideast region
Rupp Arena – Lexington, Kentucky
First round games were played at Bloomington, Indiana and Baton Rouge, Louisiana on Sunday, March 13.

Midwest region
Myriad Convention Center – Oklahoma City, Oklahoma
First round games were played at Omaha, Nebraska and Norman, Oklahoma on Saturday, March 12.

Final Four
Omni Coliseum – Atlanta, Georgia

Notes
 All four regionals were played on Thursday and Saturday. The opening round the preceding weekend played twelve games on Saturday and four on Sunday.
 The tournament saw only two teams making their NCAA Tournament debut, the University of North Carolina at Charlotte and Southern Illinois University. Interestingly, both teams had hosted tournament games in their arenas before playing in the tournament; SIU Arena hosted first-round games in the 1969 tournament, and Charlotte Coliseum, which the 49ers had just moved to in 1976 after previously playing on campus at Belk Gymnasium, had hosted games seven previous years (including 1976) and would host five more times before the opening of the second Charlotte Coliseum in 1988. 
 This tournament marked the most recent appearances of Duquesne and VMI; their 45 year drought is, as of 2022, the sixth-longest active drought in the NCAA and ninth all-time.
 As of the 2022 NCAA Tournament, this was the last time the six Division I college basketball-playing schools in the Philadelphia metropolitan area: Drexel, La Salle, Penn, St. Joseph's, Temple, and Villanova – were collectively shut out of the NCAA tournament. At least one of the teams had made the tournament the previous 18 years, and the city has only been shut out twelve of the 83 tournaments.

See also
 1977 NCAA Division II basketball tournament
 1977 NCAA Division III basketball tournament
 1977 National Invitation Tournament
 1977 NAIA Division I men's basketball tournament
 1977 National Women's Invitation Tournament

References

NCAA Division I men's basketball tournament
Ncaa
NCAA Division I men's basketball tournament, 1977
NCAA Division I men's basketball tournament
NCAA Division I men's basketball tournament